Helen Blane (5 September 1913 – 12 April 2000) was a British alpine skier. She competed in the women's combined event at the 1936 Winter Olympics.

References

1913 births
2000 deaths
British female alpine skiers
Olympic alpine skiers of Great Britain
Alpine skiers at the 1936 Winter Olympics
Sportspeople from London